Delano Floyd McCoury (born February 1, 1939) is an American bluegrass musician. As leader of the Del McCoury Band, he plays guitar and sings lead vocals along with his two sons, Ronnie McCoury and Rob McCoury, who play mandolin and banjo respectively. In June 2010, he received a National Heritage Fellowship lifetime achievement award from the National Endowment for the Arts and in 2011 he was elected into the International Bluegrass Music Hall of Fame.

Career
McCoury has had a long career in bluegrass.  Although originally hired as banjo player, he sang lead vocals and played rhythm guitar for Bill Monroe's Blue Grass Boys in 1963, with whom he first appeared on the Grand Ole Opry. McCoury briefly appeared with the Golden State Boys in 1964 before taking a series of day jobs in construction and logging, while continuing to work as an amateur musician in Maryland, Virginia and Pennsylvania.

In the 1980s his sons began performing with him. Fiddler Tad Marks and bass player Mike Brantley joined McCoury's group in early 1990s. McCoury's group toured widely throughout the US. They relocated to Nashville, Tennessee as they began to attract attention. Fiddler Jason Carter and bassist Mike Bub joined in 1992. Alan Bartram joined the band as bassist in 2005. McCoury became a member of the Grand Ole Opry in October 2003.

McCoury was also one of many performers at The Clearwater Concert at Madison Square Garden on May 3, 2009. The event celebrated the 90th birthday of Pete Seeger.

McCoury has influenced a great number of bands, including Phish, with whom he has shared the stage several times, and who have covered his songs. He has also performed with The String Cheese Incident and Donna the Buffalo, and recorded with Steve Earle. McCoury has covered songs by artists as diverse as The Lovin' Spoonful, Tom Petty, and Richard Thompson. McCoury has appeared at festivals including Bonnaroo, High Sierra, the Hardly Strictly Bluegrass, The Telluride Bluegrass Festival, and the Newport Folk Festival. His television appearances include Late Night with Conan O'Brien and the Late Show with David Letterman. Del has a very enthusiastic fan base, known as the Del-Heads.

In October 2009, The Del McCoury Band began offering fans recordings of their performances on USB flash drives available immediately after their concerts.

In June 2010, McCoury received a lifetime achievement award from the National Endowment for the Arts in the field of folk and traditional arts, including a stipend of $25,000.

In 2012, he joined the 11th annual Independent Music Awards judging panel to assist independent musicians' careers.

DelFest

In 2008, Del McCoury started DelFest, an annual bluegrass festival in Cumberland, Maryland, held at the Allegany County Fairgrounds. Del McCoury Band plays every night at each of the festivals.

The 5th annual DelFest occurred in May 2012, and major bluegrass acts played such as Steve Martin with the Steep Canyon Rangers, Yonder Mountain String Band, Leftover Salmon, Infamous Stringdusters, Railroad Earth, Béla Fleck, and Sam Bush, most of which had returned from previous years at the festival.

In previous years, acts such Peter Rowan, David Grisman, Jesse McReynolds, The Avett Brothers, Old Crow Medicine Show, Trampled by Turtles, Greensky Bluegrass, and Psychograss have played.

The 14th DelFest occurred in May 2022, after a two-year delay caused by the COVID-19 pandemic.

Discography

Solo albums
 1968: Del McCoury Sings Bluegrass (Arhoolie) reissued in 1992 as I Wonder Where You Are Tonight with two previously unissued tracks
 1971: Livin' on the Mountain (Rebel) released in 1976
 1971: Collector's Special (Grassound) released in 1976
 1974: Our Kind of Grass (Rebel SLP-1569) released in 1978
 1975: 	Del McCoury (Rebel SLP 1542)
 1988: Don't Stop The Music (Rounder)

With The GrooveGrass Boyz
1998: GrooveGrass® 101 featuring the GrooveGrass Boyz™

With the Del McCoury Band

1992: Blue Side of Town
1993: A Deeper Shade of Blue
1996: The Cold Hard Facts
1999: The Mountain (with Steve Earle)
1999: The Family
2001: Del and the Boys
2003: It's Just the Night
2005: The Company We Keep
2006: The Promised Land
2008: Moneyland
2009: Family Circle
2011: American Legacies (with the Preservation Hall Jazz Band)
2012: Old Memories
2013: The Streets of Baltimore
2016: Del and Woody
2017: Del McCoury Still Sings Bluegrass

As the McCoury Brothers (with Jerry McCoury)
 1987: The McCoury Brothers (Rounder)

With the Dixie Pals
 1973: High on a Mountain (Rounder)
 1975: Del McCoury And The Dixie Pals (Revonah R-916)
 1980: Live in Japan (Copper Creek)
 1981: Take Me To The Mountains (Leather LBG-8107) reissued in 1983 as Rebel REB 1622)
 1983: Best Of Del McCoury And The Dixie Pals (Rebel REB 1610)
 1985: Sawmill (Rebel REB 1636)
 1991: Classic Bluegrass (Rebel) compilation of 1974-1984 Rebel Records recordings

With Mac Wiseman and Doc Watson
 1998: Del Doc & Mac (Sugar Hill)

Also appears on
 2011: Audie Blaylock and Redline - I'm Going Back to Old Kentucky: A Bill Monroe Celebration (Rural Rhythm)

Awards and honors
Del McCoury has won 31 International Bluegrass Music Association Awards, including Entertainer of the Year four consecutive times (nine total). McCoury has also won IBMA Male Vocalist of the Year four times.  In 2004 he was nominated for the Best Bluegrass Album Grammy Award for It's Just The Night, and in 2006 he won his first Grammy Award, in the same category, for The Company We Keep. In 2014, McCoury was nominated and won his second Grammy Award for The Streets of Baltimore. He was a recipient of a 2010 National Heritage Fellowship awarded by the National Endowment for the Arts, which is the United States government's highest honor in the folk and traditional arts. McCoury received the Bluegrass Star Award, presented by the Bluegrass Heritage Foundation, in 2015.  The award is bestowed upon bluegrass artists who do an exemplary job of advancing traditional bluegrass music and bringing it to new audiences while preserving its character and heritage.

International Bluegrass Music Association Awards

1990 Male Vocalist of the Year – Del McCoury
1991 Male Vocalist of the Year – Del McCoury
1992 Male Vocalist of the Year – Del McCoury
1994 Entertainer of the Year – The Del McCoury Band
1994 Album of the Year – A Deeper Shade of Blue; Del McCoury
1996 Instrumental Group of the Year – The Del McCoury Band
1996 Entertainer of the Year – Del McCoury
1996 Male Vocalist of the Year – Del McCoury
1997 Instrumental Group of the Year – The Del McCoury Band
1997 Entertainer of the Year – The Del McCoury Band
1997 Album of the Year – True Life Blues – The Songs of Bill Monroe; Sam Bush, Vassar Clements, Mike Compton, Jerry Douglas, Stuart Duncan, Pat Enright, Greg Garing, Richard Greene, David Grier, David Grisman, John Hartford, Bobby Hicks, Kathy Kallick, Laurie Lewis, Mike Marshall, Del McCoury, Ronnie McCoury, Jim Nunally, Scott Nygaard, Mollie O'Brien, Tim O'Brien, Alan O'Bryant, Herb Pedersen, Todd Phillips, John Reischman, Peter Rowan, Craig Smith, Chris Thile, Tony Trischka, Roland White.
1998 Entertainer of the Year – The Del McCoury Band
1999 Entertainer of the Year – The Del McCoury Band
2000 Entertainer of the Year – The Del McCoury Band
2002 Entertainer of the Year – The Del McCoury Band
2002 Song of the Year – 1952 Vincent Black Lightning; The Del McCoury Band (artists), Richard Thompson (writer)
2003 Entertainer of the Year – The Del McCoury Band
2004 Entertainer of the Year – The Del McCoury Band
2004 Album of the Year – It's Just the Night; The Del McCoury Band

Notes and references

External links

Discography at Discography of Bluegrass Sound Recordings
 
 
 
 

1939 births
Living people
American bluegrass guitarists
American male guitarists
American country guitarists
American country singer-songwriters
American male singer-songwriters
American bluegrass musicians
National Heritage Fellowship winners
People from Bakersville, North Carolina
Grammy Award winners
Grand Ole Opry members
Singer-songwriters from North Carolina
Rebel Records artists
Musicians from York, Pennsylvania
Guitarists from North Carolina
Guitarists from Pennsylvania
20th-century American guitarists
Country musicians from Pennsylvania
Country musicians from North Carolina
20th-century American male musicians
Del McCoury Band members
Singer-songwriters from Pennsylvania